Richard Copley Christie (22 July 1830 – 9 January 1901) was an English lawyer, university teacher, philanthropist and bibliophile.

He was born at Lenton in Nottinghamshire, the son of a mill owner. He was educated at Lincoln College, Oxford where he was tutored by Mark Pattison, and was called to the bar at Lincoln's Inn in 1857. He also held numerous academic appointments, notably the professorships of history (from 1854 to 1856) and of political economy (from 1855 to 1866) at Owens College. He always took an active interest in this college, of which he was one of the governors. In 1898 he gave the Christie Library building, designed by Alfred Waterhouse: the plan connected this on the east with the Whitworth Hall.

Philanthropy
Christie was a friend of the industrialist Sir Joseph Whitworth. By Whitworth's will, Christie was appointed one of three legatees, each of whom was left more than half a million pounds for their own use, ‘they being each of them aware of the objects’ to which these funds would have been put by Whitworth. They chose to spend more than a fifth of the money on support for Owens College, together with the purchase of land now occupied by the Manchester Royal Infirmary. In 1897, Christie personally assigned more than £50,000 for the erection of the Whitworth Hall, to complete the front quadrangle of Owens College. He was president of the Whitworth Institute from 1890 to 1895 and was much interested in the medical and other charities of Manchester, especially the Cancer Pavilion and Home, of whose committee he was chairman from 1890 to 1893, and which later became the Christie Hospital. In October 1893 the freedom of the city of Manchester was conferred upon him and on his surviving fellow legatee, R. D. Darbishire.

Chancellor of the diocese
From 1872 to 1894, Christie was Chancellor of the Anglican Diocese of Manchester. In that capacity, he advised Bishop of Manchester James Fraser on the matters that led to the imprisonment of the Rev. Sidney Faithorn Green under the Public Worship Regulation Act 1874.

Bibliophily
Christie was an enthusiastic book collector, and bequeathed to Owens College his library of about 15,000 volumes, rich in a very complete set of the books printed by Étienne Dolet, a series of Aldine Press publications, and of volumes printed by Sebastian Gryphius and other European humanists. His Étienne Dolet, the Martyr of the Renaissance (1880) is the most exhaustive work on the subject. He died at Ribsden in Surrey after a long period of illness: the book collection has always been separate from the general stock of the library of Manchester University and was transferred to the John Rylands Library building in Deansgate in 1972. A printed catalogue was issued in 1915 by the librarian, Charles Leigh. A stained glass window commemorates him on the staircase of the Christie Library.

Scholarship
He was the author of a number of essays and contributions to periodicals, some of which were published after his death. He was a Member of the Chetham Society, serving as a Member of Council from 1868, as vice-president in 1882–3, and as president from 1884 until 1901.

References

Sources
 Manchester book collectors, by Brenda J. Scragg
 Rigg, J. Anthony (1968) "A  comparative history of the libraries of Manchester and Liverpool Universities up to 1903", in: Saunders, W. L., ed. University and Research Library Studies: some contributions from the University of Sheffield Post-graduate School of Librarianship and Information Science. Oxford: Pergamon Press, 1968
 Charles Leigh, "Catalogue of the Christie Collection : Comprising the Printed Books and Manuscripts Bequeathed to the Library of the University of Manchester by the Late Richard Copley Christie, LL. D.", Manchester: University Press, 1915, available at Archive.org

External links

 

1830 births
1901 deaths
People associated with the Victoria University of Manchester
Alumni of Lincoln College, Oxford
Members of Lincoln's Inn
People from Lenton, Nottingham
English philanthropists
English book and manuscript collectors
19th-century British philanthropists
Manchester Literary and Philosophical Society
Record Society of Lancashire and Cheshire
Chetham Society